Wild Women: Gentle Beasts is a feature documentary by Swiss director Anka Schmid, released in 2015. Schmid documents the life and work of female animal tamers from four nations: Egypt, France, Germany and Russia. The world premiere was at the film festival Visions du Réel in Nyon in April 2015. The international premiere was at the Hof International Film Festival in October 2015.

Summary 
Wild Women - Gentle Beasts documents the life and work of five animal tamers, Namayca Bauer from France, Carmen Zander from Germany, Nadezhda and Aliya Takshantova from Russia as well as Anosa Kouta from Egypt, who, due to the political circumstances at the time of shooting was touring in Qatar. The film shows not only the women on stage performing their breath taking acts but also their life off stage where they fight for their existence in a profession that might soon be banned. All of them work in a circus and tame tigers (Zander), lions (Bauer and Kouta) and bears (Takshantova). Schmid shows the life beyond the flashy stage shows and mainly takes a close look at the harsh reality of everyday life in a circus. The camera follows them around and in a respectful manner gets very close to the animal tamers. They reveal their deep passion and love for their wild animals and their extraordinary job, as well as their desires, aspirations and fears. It shows how the women have to cross their own physical and mental limits on a daily basis and that mortal danger is an integral part of their vocation. In contrasting images of domina vs. lap cat and beauty vs. the beast the film shows how affectionate yet extremely exhausting the relationship between animals and tamers is.

Festivals and screenings 
 March 2016: Thessaloniki Documentary Festival
 February 2016: Cairo International Women's Film Festival
 January 2016: Solothurn Film Festival
 December 2015: Artdocfest Moscow
 November 2015: Dharamshala International Film Festival
 November 2015: Biberacher Filmfestspiele
 October 2015: Hof International Film Festival
 August 2015: Festival del Film Locarno
 April 2015: Visions du Réel, Nyon

References

External links 
 Official website
 
 Wild Women: Gentle Beasts on Swissfilms
 Wild Women: Gentle Beasts on Reck Filmproduktion

2015 films
2015 documentary films
Swiss documentary films
2010s German-language films
Documentary films about women
Documentary films about circus performers